Mašići is a village in the municipality of Gradiška, Republika Srpska, Bosnia and Herzegovina.

The village was the starting site of Jančić's Revolt (1809) and the Second Mašići Rebellion (1834).

References

Populated places in Gradiška, Bosnia and Herzegovina